Vera Nikolić (Serbian Cyrillic: Вера Николић; 23 September 1948 – 28 June 2021) was a Serbian middle-distance runner, who competed at the 1968 and 1972 Olympics, and later coach. She had her best achievements in the 800 m event, in which she won European titles in 1966 and 1971 and set a world record, 2:00.5, on 20 July 1968 holding it until 11 July 1971. She came to the 1968 Olympics as a favorite, but due to the pressure of being the favorite she gave up her semifinal – after leading it for 300 m she suddenly stepped off the track, walked back to the start, sat down and took off her shoes. She set her personal best in 800 m in finishing fifth in the final at 1972 Olympics.

Nikolić received a Golden Badge of Sport, award for the best athlete of Yugoslavia in 1966.

References

External links 

 
 

1948 births
2021 deaths
People from Despotovac
Serbian female middle-distance runners
Yugoslav female middle-distance runners
Olympic athletes of Yugoslavia
Athletes (track and field) at the 1968 Summer Olympics
Athletes (track and field) at the 1972 Summer Olympics
World record setters in athletics (track and field)
European Athletics Championships medalists
Mediterranean Games gold medalists for Yugoslavia
Athletes (track and field) at the 1971 Mediterranean Games
Mediterranean Games medalists in athletics